Zenkerella  may refer to:
 Zenkerella, a monotypic genus of rodents in the family Anomaluridae with the only species Zenkerella insignis
 Zenkerella (plant), a legume genus